915 Cosette is an S-type asteroid belonging to the Flora family of Main Belt asteroids. Its rotation period is 4.445 hours.

References

External links
 
 

000915
000915
Discoveries by François Gonnessiat
Named minor planets
000915
19181214